Oliver Friedmann is a German computer scientist and mathematician known for his work on parity games and the simplex algorithm.

Friedmann earned his doctorate's degree from the Ludwig Maximilian University of Munich in 2011 under the supervision of Martin Hofmann and Martin Lange.

Awards
He won the Kleene Award for showing that state-of-the-art policy iteration algorithms for parity games require exponential time in the worst case. He and his coauthors extended the proof techniques to the simplex algorithm and to policy iteration for Markov decision processes. His seminal body of work on lower bounds in convex optimization, leading to a sub-exponential lower bound for Zadeh's rule, was awarded with the Tucker Prize.

References 

Chief technology officers
German computer scientists
Ludwig Maximilian University of Munich alumni
Living people
Year of birth missing (living people)